Karuthamma is a 1994 Indian Tamil-language drama film produced and directed by Bharathiraja from a story by M. Rathnakumar. The film stars Raja, Rajashree and Maheswari, with Saranya, Periyar Dasan, Ponvannan, Vadivukkarasi, Vaani, Vadivelu, and Janagaraj in supporting roles. It is set in a village where female infanticide is prevalent and considered acceptable, but the title character is against the practice. The music was scored by A. R. Rahman with cinematography by B. Kannan and editing by K. Pazhanivel.

Karuthamma was released on 3 November 1994 and became a commercial success. Besides being the blockbuster of that year, the film won three National Film Awards, four Tamil Nadu State Film Awards and the Filmfare Award for Best Film – Tamil. The film brought widespread attention to the practice of female infanticide and compelled the government at national and state levels to enact various laws to curb this practice.

Plot 

Mokkatha, the wife of Mokkaiyan, a farmer in Pottalpetti village, is in labour. They already have two daughters and are keen to have a son; two daughters born earlier were killed soon after birth by feeding them with poisonous cactus extract. Unable to pay hefty dowries for their daughters' marriages, the villagers consider female infanticide acceptable. A new school teacher, Soosai, feels sad on learning about this practice. When Mokkatha delivers a girl again, Mokkaiyan orders the village midwife Mooli to kill the baby. Mooli reluctantly tries to feed the cactus extract to the baby at a secluded place. Soosai notices this, meets her, and requests to hand over the infant so that he can raise her. She hands over the infant, and he moves away from the village.

Years later, Stephen, a veterinarian, comes to the village. Mokkaiyan's first daughter Ponnatha is married to Thavasi, the son of Mokkaiyan's nefarious sister Kaliamma. The second daughter, Karuthamma, takes care of the family. After getting into some tiff with Stephen, Karuthamma falls in love with him.

Ponnatha has two daughters and is pregnant for the third time. As a girl is born again, Kaliamma orders to kill it. To save her child, Ponnatha escapes with her baby and is chased by Thavasi, who beats her to death; the child also dies. He and Kaliamma lie that Ponnatha committed suicide as her third child was also a girl. Karuthamma, devastated by the death of her sister, does not believe this story. Ponnatha had earlier expressed her fear to her that if she delivered a girl again, Kaliamma would kill her.

When Karuthamma is giving a ceremonial bath to Ponnatha's body, she notices bloodstains on her abdomen. Concluding that she was murdered, Karuthamma stops the funeral and rushes to tell the police. The village chairman Chellamuthu, who is close to Thavasi, asks the police not to intervene, and they comply. Karuthamma refuses to leave the station. Stephen, who was passing by, threatens action against the police if they do not act on her complaint, as he is also a government employee. With no option, the police takes Ponnatha's body away and arrests Thavasi and Kaliamma.

Rosy, a doctor, comes to meet her close relative Stephen. Her presence and closeness with Stephen are misunderstood by Karuthamma. Rosy loves Stephen, but he only likes her. Kaliamma's husband celebrates her arrest by drinking with Mokkaiyan, who is not used to liquor. Mokkaiyan suffers a paralytic attack and loses control of his limbs. Rosy tends to him, and in the process gets attached to Mokkaiyan and Karuthamma.

A few weeks later, when Thavasi and Kaliamma get bail, they come to attack Karuthamma, but Stephen saves her. Chellamuthu manipulates the villagers into accepting Thavasi's proposal that Karuthamma must marry Thavasi to take care of Ponnatha's daughters (by which the police case will also be closed). Chellamuthu, who has lent money to Mokkaiyan, threatens and seeks immediate repayment if he does not accept this proposal.

Thavasi's father realises that his son is using the young children as bait and takes away the children with him one night. However, he is caught by Thavasi, who, motivated by Chellamuthu, burns his father to death. Thavasi takes the children away and forces Karuthamma to come with him to their village to marry him. Shocked with all this, Mokkaiyan consumes poison and is on his deathbed.

When Rosy expresses her love to Stephen, he gets surprised and states that he loves Karuthamma. Rosy is shocked as she was keen to marry him and decides to move away from the village. When the villagers ask her to treat Mokkaiyan, who is fighting for his life, she does not as she is keen to leave. When her father Soosai arrives, Mooli realises that he is the same person who took Mokkiayan's third daughter. Mooli reveals to Rosy that Mokkaiyan is her real father, and Soosai also confirms it. Rosy treats Mokkaiyan, who now realises his mistake of killing female infants without realising their worth.

Karuthamma, on the eve of her wedding, demands to see the children taken away earlier by Thavasi's father. However, Thavasi is unable to show his children (as they were taken by Chellamuthu to use them as bait to force himself on Karuthamma). That night, Chellamuthu makes Thavasi drunk and asks him to spare Karuthamma for that night. Thavasi agrees in a drunken state, which is overheard by Karuthamma, who also learns that Thavasi had killed his own father. When Chellamuthu goes to meet Karuthamma, she is well prepared to meet him. She murders him and then Thavasi. After saving Ponnatha's children, who were locked inside a box, she returns to her village. Realising that Rosy is her own sister, Karuthamma asks her to look after the children and their father and leaves with the police. Stephen decides to wait for her.

Cast

Production 
The film was titled after Bharathiraja's mother. The story was based on a real-life incident in a village, and the script was written by Bharathiraja's relative M. Rathnakumar. Periyar Dasan, who worked as a professor in Pachaiyappa's College, made his acting debut with this film, as did Rajashree and Maheswari; Rajashree's voice was dubbed by Raadhika.<ref>{{Cite web |date=6 November 2019 |title=மகேஸ்வரிக்கும், எனக்கும் ஒரு பெரிய ஆசை... அதை பாரதிராஜா சார்கிட்ட சொன்னப்ப"-'கருத்தம்மா' ராஜஸ்ரீ |url=https://cinema.vikatan.com/tamil-cinema/actress-rajashree-shares-her-experience-about-karuthamma-movie |url-status=live |archive-url=https://archive.today/20201128115515/https://cinema.vikatan.com/tamil-cinema/actress-rajashree-shares-her-experience-about-karuthamma-movie |archive-date=28 November 2020 |access-date=28 November 2020 |website=Ananda Vikatan |language=ta}}</ref> Kamala Sekhar, the film's art director, also portrayed the village chairman Chellamuthu.

 Music 
The soundtrack was composed by A. R. Rahman, with lyrics by Vairamuthu. The film marked Rahman's second collaboration with Bharathiraja after Kizhakku Cheemayile. As with Kizhakku Cheemayile, the songs in Karuthamma also gained Rahman notice for composing folk music, contrary to his reputation for composing westernised music. The song "Poraale Ponnuthayi" is based on Mohanam raga. The music of "Poraale Ponnuthayi" was reused for "Gurus of Peace" in the album Vande Mataram. Release Karuthamma was released on 3 November 1994. The film received critical acclaim and became a commercial success, running for over 100 days in theatres.

 Reception Ananda Vikatan mentioned in its review dated 4 December 1994, "Though the subject taken up was delicate, instead of making a documentary, the director has narrated the film, through visuals, which should be appreciated. Bharathiraja must be congratulated for making a heart – wrenching film on a delicate subject without lecturing us on the theme". The film was given 45 marks. Malini Mannath of The Indian Express wrote, "Karuthamma is a film that will move many a human heart." K. Vijiyan of New Straits Times wrote, "Bharathiraja returns to do what he is best at — telling stories about ordinary village people [...] And in Karuthamma he has a winner". He also praised the film's humour, a rare feature in Bharathiraja's films. Prince of Kalki lauded Bharathiraja for daring to depict such an atrocious social problem onscreen.

 Accolades 

 Legacy 

Social Impact
The first film to bring to light the menace of female infanticide on screen, Karuthamma forced the government at national and state levels to act against this practice and bring in suitable laws to curb it. It became a catalyst for this change in the society, and was instrumental in "making way for the ban on prenatal sexual identification".

In other films
The theme of Karuthamma found place in other Tamil films, especially in the form of comic scenes or comedy films. In Kadhal Sadugudu (2003), a character played by Theni Kunjarammal tries to kill a female child with poisoned milk. Super Subbu (Vivek), who sees this, comically remarks that he has been seeing this from the days of Karuthamma.  Scenes from Karuthamma have also been parodied in Thamizh Padam'' (2010), in which the theme of female infanticide has been replaced with that of male infanticide. Periyar Dasan reprises his role from the original film.

References

Bibliography

External links 
 

1990s Tamil-language films
1994 films
Best Film on Family Welfare National Film Award winners
Films about sex selection in India
Films about women in India
Films directed by Bharathiraja
Films scored by A. R. Rahman
Indian drama films
Indian feminist films